Ataxia setulosa is a species of beetle in the family Cerambycidae. It was described by Fall in 1907. On males, the antennae are slightly longer than the body. It is native to Baja California.

References

Ataxia (beetle)
Beetles described in 1907